Bojana Jovanovski was the defending champion, but he chose not to compete in the 2014 competition. 

Magda Linette won the title over Wang Qiang with the score 3–6, 7–5, 6–1.

Seeds

Main draw

Finals

Top half

Bottom half

References 
 Main draw
 Qualifying draw

Ningbo International Women's Tennis Open - Singles
Ningbo International Women's Tennis Open